The A40 is a trunk road which runs between London and Goodwick (Fishguard), Wales, and officially called The London to Fishguard Trunk Road (A40) in all legal documents and Acts. Much of its length within England has been superseded by motorways, such as the M40, and has lost its trunk road status, though it retains it west of Gloucester, including its length within Wales. The eastern section from Denham, Buckinghamshire to Wheatley, Oxfordshire is better served by the M40 and its former function of linking London with Cheltenham and Gloucester has been taken by the M4, A419 and A417 via Swindon.

History
The A40 1923 route was from the City of London to Fishguard. The road still begins and ends in the same places, but a number of changes have been made to its route.

The first change dates from 1935, between Ross-on-Wye and Abergavenny.  The original route of the A40 was via Skenfrith, avoiding Monmouth; this road was renumbered the B4521. The A40 was rerouted via Raglan; between Ross and Raglan it replaced part of the A48, between Raglan and Llanvihangel-nigh-Usk it replaced the B4234, and between Llanvihangel and Abergavenny it replaced part of the A471.

Subsequently, the A40 was rerouted within west London.  Western Avenue dates from the 1930s, but was originally opened as the A403.  After the Second World War, the A40 was rerouted along part of the A219 (west of Notting Hill) and Western Avenue.  The old route (via Acton, Ealing, Southall, Hayes, Hillingdon and Uxbridge) was renumbered the A4020.

Initially, the A40 went through the centre of Oxford, via Headington, Magdalen Bridge, the High Street, Carfax and Botley, and over the Swinford Toll Bridge to Eynsham.  It was rerouted in the 1930s to follow the first section of the Oxford Ring Road to the north of the city, and then followed a direct line to bypass Eynsham.  The old route became part of the A420 to Botley, and the section between Botley and Eynsham was renumbered the A4141, renumbered again in the 1960s to the B4044.

Route

Central London – Denham

In central London it is High Holborn and then Oxford Street. At Marble Arch it joins the A5 Edgware Road as far as the Marylebone Flyover to become Westway (formerly classified A40(M) as an elevated motorway, it is now an A-road) then meets Western Avenue. For the greater part, this section is six lanes, otherwise four lanes. With two exceptions, Western Avenue forms a grade-separated motorway standard dual-carriageway between Paddington and the M40 motorway. The two at-grade intersections are Gypsy Corner and Savoy Circus; both of which are traffic light controlled. At Denham Roundabout, the six lane Western Avenue flows into the M40.

Denham – Oxford 
The A40 branches off the Denham roundabout to run as a dual carriageway. After the junction with the A413, the A40 follows the same route as the M40 as a single carriageway, passing through Beaconsfield and High Wycombe. Beyond Stokenchurch the road is much quieter; when meeting the B4009 and A329 those roads have priority. Approaching Oxford, the A40 becomes a busy dual carriageway, carrying traffic from the M40 to Oxford and beyond. The road forms the northern section of the Oxford Ring Road, crossing the A44 and the A34. In Oxford, it passes the Thornhill Park and Ride, where the OxfordTube, The Airline to Heathrow & Gatwick, & Oxford Park and Ride buses stop.

Oxford – Cheltenham (M5)
The A40 passes under the A34, reverting to single carriageway for  until the dual carriageway just east of Witney with a grade-separated junction. The dual carriageway finishes at a roundabout. For the rest of Oxfordshire and Gloucestershire until Cheltenham, other than for a few short stretches, the road is single carriageway. Before Andoversford the A436 breaks off to the west to try to take traffic away from descending into the centre of Cheltenham itself. The road travels through Cheltenham town centre along at least two parallel routes (neither is part of a one-way system: Sandford Road and Montpellier Terrace make up one part, Thirlestaine Road and Suffolk Road the other). Becoming a dual carriageway, it passes GCHQ in Cheltenham and the three-level stacked roundabout junction with the M5 motorway. In February 2015, the Witney Oxford Transport Group proposed the reopening of Yarnton railway station as an alternative to improvements to the A40 road proposed by Oxfordshire County Council.

Cheltenham (M5) – Abergavenny
The A40 is the Gloucester bypass, most of which is dual carriageway. The junction with the A48 to Chepstow is at Highnam. For the remainder of Gloucestershire, and a part of Herefordshire, the road is single carriageway until Ross-on-Wye. There it connects with the M50 motorway, and forms part of the high quality dual carriageway between South Wales and the English Midlands. From Ross-on-Wye to Monmouth the road follows the Wye Valley, an Area of Outstanding Natural Beauty, crossing the Wales–England border a mile east of Monmouth. Just west of Monmouth are twin tunnels; these are the only tunnels on the A40. Near Raglan, the A40 has a grade separated junction with the A449. The A40 continues as a dual carriageway to Abergavenny.

Abergavenny – M50 junctions

Abergavenny – Carmarthen
At Abergavenny is the A40 junction with the Heads of the Valleys road, (A465) and the A4042. Now the A465 becomes the primary route between the Midlands to the South Wales Valleys and Swansea; there is a dual-carriageway route to Carmarthen via the A465, M4 and A48.

The A40 becomes single carriageway and continues through Abergavenny, following the north side of the Usk valley through the eastern part of the Brecon Beacons National Park until Brecon. Continuing as a dual carriageway, the A40 and A470 concurrent bypass Brecon to the south, crossing the River Usk here. At the western end of the bypass is a further junction with the A470 south. Beyond this point the A40 continues as a single carriageway, now south of the River Usk, and roughly follows the northern edge of the Brecon Beacons National Park. In Llandovery the road crosses the Heart of Wales railway and the River Tywi; the road, railway and river then run parallel until Llandeilo, where the National Park ends and the railway turns south. The A40 continues west along the Tywi valley to Carmarthen where as a dual carriageway it forms the eastern bypass, meeting the terminus of the A48 at Pensarn. Here the A40 returns to being a primary route westwards.

Carmarthen – Fishguard
Now the A40 is a mixture of 2 or 3 lane single-carriageway to Haverfordwest and Fishguard. This section of road is controlled by the Welsh Government (formerly 'Welsh Assembly Government'), which describes it as "one of the lowest standard sections of the Trans European Road Network in the United Kingdom".

St Clears to Haverfordwest dualling
There were plans in 2002 for a major improvement of the 23-mile stretch between St Clears and Haverfordwest which included upgrading to a dual carriageway; described as an extension of the national motorway network to the West Wales coast by virtue of the route from the M4 motorway being entirely dual carriageway. The £60 million scheme was subject to a European Environmental Assessment.  Within a couple of years, the project appeared to be dying a very quiet death, causing local newspapers to report it being an election stunt for the two marginal constituencies that would best benefit from the improvements.  The following Welsh elections saw both constituencies change the party of majority.  The political party at the centre of the row instead directed the project deferment to damning environmental statements by Friends of the Earth Cymru. The scheme was officially scrapped in 2008 after a Welsh Assembly committee decided to abandon the proposals.  Instead, it recommended upgrades to the existing route including bypasses around Robeston Wathen and Llanddewi Velfrey using a three-lane option.  This was welcomed by the Friends of the Earth, saying "The dual carriageway on the A40 would increase traffic levels, increase the emission of greenhouse gases, it would be harmful for the environment, it would be hugely expensive. That money would be better spent on improving public transport, on health, on education, there's no need for it. We think the assembly committee has come to the right decision".

Whitland Bypass
The last improvement to the A40 on this section prior to the Welsh Assembly Government having the devolved responsibility for this road was a  £8 million bypass around Whitland.  Constructed in 1994, the road started east of Black Bridge on the original A40, then running north of the town before to a new roundabout just west of Llain Cottage.  The Secretary of State for Wales was asked a written question by Rhodri Morgan about adding a second carriageway to the Whitland bypass scheme, to which John Redwood replied "There are no proposals to add a second carriageway to the Whitland bypass. The design capacity of a single carriageway two-lane highway is more than adequate to cater with the anticipated traffic flows for the foreseeable future."

Llanddewi Velfrey Bypass
A new bypass has been granted approval by the Welsh Assembly Government at Llanddewi Velfrey in Pembrokeshire.  The scheme would improve the A40 between Llanddewi Velfrey and Penblewin, to the west of St Clears and meet the aim of the targeted investment in infrastructure along the east–west road corridor in south Wales. From the east, it is proposed that a roundabout would be created just north of Glenfield Farm, where the straight section from St Clears ends at Bethel Chapel, and then take a new route north-west of the town of Llanddewi Velfrey, south-west over Pentroydin Fawr and Penttroydin Fech farms with cattle underpasses, a new underpass beneath the existing Llanddewi Velfrey to Llanfallteg road, before going over the original A40 at Ffynnon Wood.  To the west of Ffynnon Wood, the road would then cross back over the original A40 to the east of Henllan Lodge in a way to maintain the tree lined avenue to Henllan, then run parallel to the A40 on the north side of the existing A40 to a new roundabout at Penblewin and the junction with the A478.

This was originally known as the Blue and Purple routes during the Consultation in 2006 for which 75% preferred the blue route, and only 20% preferred the red route.  54% felt the section from Ffynnon Wood and Penblewin Roundabout needed improvement, with both orange and purple routes preferred by 42% of the respondents. Welsh Water/Dwr Cymru expressed concerns with the red route affecting water mains and sewers, and Henllanfallteg Community Council felt the red route would not improve the quality of life in Llanddewi Velfrey. Pembrokeshire County Council expressed concerns that the route planned was a single carriageway, and that within seven years, a dual carriageway would be required.

Robeston Wathen Bypass
A new bypass has been constructed between Penblewin and Slebech Park making the road straighter and with a '2+1' road layout to help improve overtaking opportunities.

Construction started on the route in February 2009, with the works completed and the new road opening 1 March 2011.  The road was built by Costain.  The scheme was nearly £14 million over the initial budget of £27.6 million, eventually costing £41.4 million.  The Welsh Assembly Government explains this increase as being the result of inflation and land costs, saying the original budget did not include either, as well as additional statutory procedures, additional works following some design standards, and the increase in VAT.

The Kell
The Kell is located on a section of the A40 that forms a north–south corridor between Fishguard,  to the north and Haverfordwest,  to the south, close to Treffgarne and Spittal. The original road has subsequently been converted to an access road for The Old Mill, Beavers Lodge and The Kell, accessing the new road at The Old Mill.

Fishguard Bypass
The Fishguard Bypass was planned to provide a more direct route with greater capacity to the Port of Fishguard at Goodwick avoiding the town centre of Fishguard. It was constructed during the late 1990s and opened in 2000. It takes the form of a three-lane carriageway on an approx. 10% gradient around the western edge of Fishguard. It runs from its highest point at Rafael roundabout 1 km south of Fishguard town in a generally northerly direction to its lowest point at Windy Hall roundabout where it rejoins the old A40 route at Gasworks Hill. The bypass is concurrent with a section of the A487 trunk road with the A40 dominant.

Gallery

See also
 British road numbering scheme
 Trunk roads in Wales

References

Further reading
 Edward Platt, Leadville: A Biography of the A40 (Picador, 2001). .

Constituent roads of European route E30
Roads in Buckinghamshire
Roads in Carmarthenshire
Roads in Gloucestershire
Roads in Herefordshire
Roads in London
Roads in Monmouthshire
Roads in Oxfordshire
Roads in Pembrokeshire
Roads in Powys
40
Streets in the London Borough of Camden
Streets in the London Borough of Ealing
Streets in the London Borough of Hammersmith and Fulham
Streets in the London Borough of Hillingdon
Streets in the Royal Borough of Kensington and Chelsea
Streets in the City of Westminster